John Wood (1839 – 26 January 1909) was a New Zealand cricketer. He played in six first-class matches for Canterbury and Wellington from 1868 to 1878.

References

External links
 

1839 births
1909 deaths
New Zealand cricketers
Canterbury cricketers
Wellington cricketers